Sheikh Hassan Moussa is the leading imam of the Stockholm Mosque at Medborgarplatsen. The mosque is run by the Islamiska Förbundet i Stockholm. A Svenska Dagbladet report accused him of deliberately misleading the Swedish public regarding the controversial contents of his sermons.

Notes

Year of birth missing (living people)
Living people
Swedish imams